A variator is a device that can change its parameters, or can change parameters of other devices.

Often a variator is a mechanical power transmission device that can change its gear ratio continuously (rather than in steps).

Examples
 Beier variable-ratio gear
 Continuously variable transmission
 Evans friction cone
 NuVinci Continuously Variable Transmission
 Variator (variable valve timing)
 Variomatic
 VANOS

See also
 Epicyclic gearing

 
Mechanical power control